The Inter-Services Intelligence (ISI) intelligence agency of Pakistan has been accused of being heavily involved in covertly running military intelligence programs in Afghanistan since before the Soviet invasion of Afghanistan in 1979. The first ISI operation in Afghanistan took place in 1975. It was in "retaliation to Republic of Afghanistan's proxy war and support to the militants against Pakistan". Before 1975, ISI did not conduct any operation in Afghanistan and it was only after decade of Republic of Afghanistan's proxy war against Pakistan, support to militants and armed incursion in 1960 and 1961 in Bajaur that Pakistan was forced to retaliate. Later on, in the 1980s, the ISI in Operation Cyclone systematically coordinated the distribution of arms and financial means provided by the United States Central Intelligence Agency (CIA) to  factions of the Afghan mujahideen such as the Hezb-e Islami (HeI) of Gulbuddin Hekmatyar and the forces of Ahmad Shah Massoud whose forces would later be known as the Northern Alliance.  After the Soviet retreat, the different Mujahideen factions turned on each other and were unable to come to a power sharing deal which resulted in a civil war.  The United States, along with the ISI and the Pakistani government of Prime Minister Benazir Bhutto became the primary source of support for Hekmatyar in his 1992–1994 bombardment campaign against the Islamic State of Afghanistan and the capital Kabul.

It is widely agreed that after Hekmatyar failed to take over power in Afghanistan, the ISI helped to found the Afghan Taliban. The ISI and other parts of the Pakistan military subsequently provided financial, logistical, military and direct combat support to the Taliban until the September 11 attacks of 2001. It is widely acknowledged that the ISI has given the Afghan Taliban safe havens inside Pakistan and supported the Taliban's resurgence in Afghanistan after 9/11 helping them, especially the Haqqani network, carry out attacks inside Afghanistan. Pakistani officials deny this accusation. Allegations have been raised by international government officials, policy analysts and even Pakistani military officials that the ISI in conjunction with the military leadership has also provided some amount of support and refuge to al-Qaeda. Such allegations were increasingly issued when Al-Qaeda leader Osama Bin Laden was killed in 2011 while living in the Pakistani city of Abbottabad.

The beginnings : a response to Afghan interference
In his history of the ISI, Hein Kiessling claims that the Republic of Afghanistan support to anti-Pakistani militants had forced then-Prime Minister of Pakistan Zulfiqar Ali Bhutto and Naseerullah Khan Babar, then-Inspector General of the Frontier Corps in NWFP (now Khyber Pakhtunkhwa), to adopt a more aggressive approach towards Afghanistan. As a result, ISI, under the command of Major General Ghulam Jilani Khan set up a 5,000-strong Afghan guerrilla troop, which would include influential future leaders like Gulbuddin Hekmatyar, Burhanuddin Rabbani and Ahmed Shah Masood, to target the Afghan government, the first large operation, in 1975, being the sponsoring of an armed rebellion in the Panjshir valley. In a polemical assessment, Afghan feminist Alia Rawi Akbar writes that Massoud, during this uprising, "by the order of ISI", assassinated the mayor "of his home city", before he "ran to Pakistan."

Another historian of the ISI, Owen Sirrs, precises how the 1973 coup d'état which brought president Sardar Mohammed Daoud Khan, a proponent of a Pashtunistan independent state and fiercely anti-Pakistan, helping both Pashtun and Baloch militants, convinced Bhutto to use Islamist rebels in order to fight the ethnic Pashtun or Baloch brands of nationalism, and he described the ISI plan in multiple phases, "phase one was stepping up intelligence collection in that country, including ferreting out potential Afghan allies and weaknesses in the Daoud regime. Under phase two ISI operatives contacted the exiled Afghan King in an unsuccessful bid to have him lead an anti-Daoud resistance movement. Phase three involved joint anti-Afghan operations with Iran, since both the Shah and Bhutto regarded the PDPA as a threat to the regional balance of power. Iran’s intelligence service, SAVAK, backed several anti-Daoud groups unilaterally, but ISI wanted to entice the Iranians into joint missions against the Afghans. The last phase in ISI’s game plan was also the most important: recruiting an insurgent army from the growing number of anti-Daoud Afghan exiles in Pakistan." These insurgents would include the likes of Ahmed Shah Massoud, Burhanuddin Rabbani, Sibghatullah Mojadeddi, Gulbuddin Hekmatyar, Jalaleddin Haqqani and Abd al-Rasul Sayyaf, all future political heavyweights of the country.

In 1974, the then prime minister of Pakistan, Zulfiqar Ali Bhutto said that:

"Two can play this game. We know where their weak points are just as they know ours. The Non-Pashtun there hate the Pashtun domination. So we have our ways of persuading Daoud to not aggravate our problems."

Abdullah Anas, the leading Afghan Arab and also their key ideologue, in his memoirs says that ISI supported the Tajiks insurgents "with the blessing of Pakistan's president Zulfikar Ali Bhutto who hoped to use this uprising as a means to pressurise the Afghan government to resolve the border disputes over Baluchistan and Pashtunistan", while describing their first military insurrection, in 1975, as "a fiasco" : Hekmatyar, who remained in Peshawar, sent men to attack government outposts in Surkhrud, without much success, while a second group, led by Massoud, in his native Panjshir valley, took control of government buildings for few days before eventually losing them, as well as many of his men, to Daud Khan's forces, something which irritated him and made him wary of Hekmatyar, blaming him for the failed operation.

The Pakistani backed rebellion, though unsuccessful, had shaken Daoud Khan to the core and made him realise the gravity of situation. He started softening his stance against Pakistan and started considering to improve relations with Pakistan. He realized that a 'friendly Pakistan was in his interest'. He also accepted Shah of Iran offer to normalize relations between Pakistan and Afghanistan. In August 1976, Daoud Khan also recognised Durand Line as international border between Pakistan and Afghanistan.

Hezb-e Islami Gulbuddin

Summary

In 1979 the Soviet Union intervened in the Afghan Civil War. The ISI and the CIA worked together to recruit Muslims throughout the world to take part in Jihad against the Soviet forces. However the CIA had little direct contact with the Mujahideen as the ISI was the main contact and handler and they favored the most radical of the groups, namely the Hezb-e Islami of Gulbuddin Hekmatyar.

In 1991, after the Soviets had left Afghanistan, the ISI tried to install a government under Hekmatyar with Jalalabad as their provisional capital, but failed. The Afghan Interim Government, which they wanted to install, had Hekmatyar as Prime Minister and Abdul Rasul Sayyaf as Foreign Minister. The central organizer of the offensive on the Pakistan side was Lieutenant-General Hamid Gul, Director-General of the ISI. The Jalalabad operation was seen as a grave mistake by other mujahideen leaders such as Ahmad Shah Massoud and Abdul Haq. Neither Massoud nor Haq had been informed of the offensive beforehand by the ISI, and neither had participated, as both commanders were considered too independent.

After operations by the Shura-e Nazar of Ahmad Shah Massoud, the defection of the communist general Abdul Rashid Dostum, and the subsequent fall of the communist Mohammad Najibullah-regime in 1992, the Afghan political parties agreed on a peace and power-sharing agreement, the Peshawar Accords. The Accords created the Islamic State of Afghanistan and appointed an interim government for a transitional period to be followed by general elections. According to Human Rights Watch:

Gulbuddin Hekmatyar received operational, financial and military support from Pakistan. Afghanistan expert Amin Saikal concludes in Modern Afghanistan: A History of Struggle and Survival:

By 1994, however, Hekmatyar had proved unable to conquer territory from the Islamic State. Australian National University Professor William Maley writes, "in this respect he was a bitter disappointment to his patrons."

Present
Since the Afghan Presidential Elections in late 2009 Afghan President Hamid Karzai has increasingly become isolated, surrounding himself with members of Hekmatyar's Hezb-e Islami. The Associated Press reports: "Several of Karzai's close friends and advisers now speak of a president whose doors have closed to all but one narrow faction and who refuses to listen to dissenting opinions."

Al-Jazeera wrote in early 2012 that Presidential Chief of Staff, Karim Khoram from Hekmatyar's Hezb-e Islami, besides controlling the Government Media and Information Center, enjoys a "tight grip" over President Karzai. Former co-workers of Khoram have accused him of acting "divisive internally" and having isolated Hamid Karzai's "non-Pashtun allies". Al-Jazeera observes: "The damage that Khoram has inflicted on President Karzai's image in one year - his enemies could not have done the same." Senior non-Hezb-e Islami Pashtun officials in the Afghan government have accused Khoram of acting as a spy for Pakistan's Inter-Services Intelligence.

Afghan Taliban

Summary

The Taliban were largely founded by Pakistan's Interior Ministry under Naseerullah Babar and the Inter-Services Intelligence (ISI) in 1994. In 1999, Naseerullah Babar who was the minister of the interior under Bhutto during the Taliban's ascent to power admitted, "we created the Taliban".

William Maley, Professor at the Australian National University and Director of the Asia-Pacific College, writes on the emergence of the Taliban in Afghanistan:

The ISI used the Taliban to establish a regime in Afghanistan which would be favorable to Pakistan, as they were trying to gain strategic depth. Since the creation of the Taliban, the ISI and the Pakistani military have given financial, logistical, military including direct combat support.

The ISI trained 80,000 fighters against the Soviet Union in Afghanistan. Peter Tomsen also stated that up until 9/11 Pakistani military and ISI officers along with thousands of regular Pakistani armed forces personnel had been involved in the fighting in Afghanistan.

Human Rights Watch wrote in 2000:

In 1998, Iran accused Pakistani commandos of "war crimes at Bamiyan". The same year Russia said, Pakistan was responsible for the "military expansion" of the Taliban in northern Afghanistan by sending large numbers of Pakistani troops, including ISI personnel, some of whom had subsequently been taken as prisoners by the anti-Taliban United Islamic Front for the Salvation of Afghanistan (aka Northern Alliance).

In 2000, the UN Security Council imposed an arms embargo against military support to the Taliban, with UN officials explicitly singling out Pakistan. The UN secretary-general criticized Pakistan for its military support and the Security Council stated it was "deeply distress[ed] over reports of involvement in the fighting, on the Taliban side, of thousands of non-Afghan nationals." In July 2001, several countries including the United States, accused Pakistan of being "in violation of U.N. sanctions because of its military aid to the Taliban." The Taliban also obtained financial resources from Pakistan. In 1997 alone, after the capture of Kabul by the Taliban, Pakistan gave $30 million in aid and a further $10 million for government wages.

After the 9/11 attacks, Pakistan claimed to have ended its support to the Taliban. But with the fall of Kabul to anti-Taliban forces in November 2001, ISI forces worked with and helped Taliban militias who were in full retreat. In November 2001, Taliban and Al-Qaeda combatants as well as Pakistani ISI and other military operatives were safely evacuated from the Afghan city of Kunduz on Pakistan Army cargo aircraft to Pakistan Air Force bases in Chitral and Gilgit in Pakistan's Northern Areas in what has been dubbed the "Airlift of Evil".

A range of officials inside and outside Pakistan have stepped up suggestions of links between the ISI and terrorist groups in recent years. In fall 2006, a leaked report by a British Defense Ministry think tank charged, "Indirectly Pakistan (through the ISI) has been supporting terrorism and extremism--whether in London on 7/7 [the July 2005 attacks on London's transit system], or in Afghanistan, or Iraq." In June 2008, Afghan officials accused Pakistan's intelligence service of plotting a failed assassination attempt on President Hamid Karzai; shortly thereafter, they implied the ISI's involvement in a July 2008 Taliban attack on the Indian embassy. Indian officials also blamed the ISI for the bombing of the Indian embassy. Numerous U.S. officials have also accused the ISI of supporting terrorist groups including the Afghan Taliban. U.S. Defense Secretary Robert Gates said "to a certain extent, they play both sides." Gates and others suggest the ISI maintains links with groups like the Afghan Taliban as a "strategic hedge" to help Islamabad gain influence in Kabul once U.S. troops exit the region. U.S. Chairman of the Joint Chiefs of Staff Admiral Mike Mullen in 2011 called the Haqqani network (the Afghan Taliban's most destructive element) a "veritable arm of Pakistan's ISI". He further stated, "Extremist organizations serving as proxies of the government of Pakistan are attacking Afghan troops and civilians as well as US soldiers."

From 2010, a report by a leading British institution also claimed that Pakistan's intelligence service still today has a strong link with the Taliban in Afghanistan. Published by the London School of Economics, the report said that Pakistan's ISI has an "official policy" of support for the Taliban. It said the ISI provides funding and training for the Taliban, and that the agency has representatives on the so-called Quetta Shura, the Taliban's leadership council. The report, based on interviews with Taliban commanders in Afghanistan, was written by Matt Waldman, a fellow at Harvard University. "Pakistan appears to be playing a double-game of astonishing magnitude," the report said. The report also linked high-level members of the Pakistani government with the Taliban. It said Asif Ali Zardari, the Pakistani president, met with senior Taliban prisoners in 2010 and promised to release them. Zardari reportedly told the detainees they were only arrested because of American pressure. "The Pakistan government's apparent duplicity – and awareness of it among the American public and political establishment – could have enormous geopolitical implications," Waldman said. "Without a change in Pakistani behaviour it will be difficult if not impossible for international forces and the Afghan government to make progress against the insurgency." Amrullah Saleh, director of Afghanistan's intelligence service until June 2010, told Reuters in 2010 that the ISI was "part of a landscape of destruction in this country".

In March 2012, the Commander of NATO forces in Afghanistan, General John Allen, told the United States Senate that as of 2012 there was still no change in Pakistan's policy of support for the Afghan Taliban and its Haqqani network. When asked by U.S. Senator John McCain whether the ISI had severed its links with the Afghan Taliban, General Allen testified: "No."

Recruitment
The Pakistani army through ISI have been accused of recruiting fighters and suicide bombers for the Afghan Taliban among the 1.7 million registered and 1-2 million unregistered Pashtun Afghan refugees living in refugee camps and settlements along the Afghan-Pakistan border in Pakistan many of whom have lived there since the Soviet–Afghan War.

Abdel Qadir, an Afghan refugee who returned to Afghanistan, says Pakistan's Inter-Services Intelligence had asked him to either receive training to join the Afghan Taliban or for him and his family to leave the country. He explains: "It is a step by step process. First they come, they talk to you. They ask you for the information. ... Then gradually they ask you for people they can train and send [to Afghanistan]. ... They say, 'Either you do what we say, or you leave the country.'"

Janat Gul, another former refugee who returned to Afghanistan, told the UN Office for the Coordination of Humanitarian Affairs, that Afghan refugees which had been successfully recruited by the ISI were taken to Pakistani training camps which had previously been used during the times of the Soviet war in Afghanistan.

According to an investigative report among Afghan refugees inside Pakistan by The New York Times, people testified that "dozens of families had lost sons in Afghanistan as suicide bombers and fighters" and "families whose sons had died as suicide bombers in Afghanistan said they were afraid to talk about the deaths because of pressure from Pakistani intelligence agents, the ISI."

Pakistani and Afghan tribal elders also testified that the ISI was arresting or even killing Taliban members which wanted to quit fighting and refused to re-enlist to fight in Afghanistan or to die as suicide bombers. One former Taliban commander told The New York Times that such arrests were then sold to the Westerners and others as part of a supposed Pakistani collaboration effort in the War against Terror.

Provision of safe haven
Gen. James L. Jones, then NATO's supreme commander, in September 2007 testified in front of the U.S. Senate Foreign Relations Committee that the Afghan Taliban movement uses the Pakistani city of Quetta as their main headquarters. Pakistan's Minister for Information and Broadcasting, Tariq Azim Khan, mocked the statement by saying, if there were any Taliban in Quetta, "you can count them on your fingers."

Training
From 2002 until 2004, without major Taliban activities, Afghanistan witnessed relative calm with Afghan civilians and foreigners being able to freely and peacefully walk the streets of major cities and reconstruction being initiated. The 2010 testimonies of former Taliban commanders show that Pakistan through its Inter-Services Intelligence was however "actively encouraging a Taliban revival" from 2004 to 2006. The effort to reintroduce the Afghan Taliban militarily in Afghanistan was preceded by a two-year, large-scale training campaign of Taliban fighters and leaders conducted by the ISI in several training camps in Quetta and other places in Pakistan. From 2004 to 2006 the Afghan Taliban consequently started a deadly insurgency campaign in Afghanistan killing thousands of civilians and combatants and thereby renewing and escalating the War in Afghanistan (2001–present). One Taliban commander involved in the Taliban resurgence said that 80 percent of his fighters had been trained in an ISI camp.

Haqqani network
The ISI have close links to the Haqqani network and contribute heavily to their funding. U.S. Chairman of the Joint Chiefs of Staff Admiral Mike Mullen in 2011 called the Haqqani network (the Afghan Taliban's most destructive element) a "veritable arm of Pakistan's ISI". He further stated:

Mullen said, the U.S. had evidence that the ISI directly planned and spearheaded the Haqqani 2011 assault on the U.S. embassy, the June 28 Haqqani attack against the Inter-Continental Hotel in Kabul and other operations. It is widely believed the suicide attack on the Indian embassy in Kabul was also planned with the help of the ISI A report in 2008 from the Director of National Intelligence stated that the ISI provides intelligence and funding to help with attacks against the International Security Assistance Force, the Afghan government and Indian targets. According to the Carnegie Endowment Center, the Inter-Services Intelligence Directorate shares an undeniable link with the Taliban, especially the Haqqani group. According to the Hindustan Times, after the 2021 Fall of Kabul, the "ISI (is) orchestrating the power play in Kabul through the Haqqani family terror company."

Al Qaeda
Besides supporting the Hezb-e Islami of Gulbuddin Hekmatyar, the ISI in conjunction with Saudi Arabia strongly supported the faction of Jalaluddin Haqqani (Haqqani network) and allied Arab groups such as the one surrounding financier Bin Laden, nowadays known as Al-Qaeda, during the war against the Soviets and the Afghan communist government in Afghanistan in the 1980s.

In 2000, British Intelligence reported that the ISI was taking an active role in several Al Qaeda training camps from the 1990s onwards. The ISI helped with the construction of training camps for both the Taliban and Al Qaeda. From 1996 to 2001 the Al Qaeda of Osama Bin Laden and Ayman al-Zawahiri became a state within the Pakistan-supported Taliban state. Bin Laden sent Arab and Central Asian Al-Qaeda militants to join the Taliban's and Pakistan's fight against the United Front (Northern Alliance) among them his Brigade 055.

It is believed that there is still contact between Al-Qaeda and the ISI today.

The former Afghan intelligence chief Amrullah Saleh has repeatedly stated that Afghan intelligence believed and had shared information about Osama Bin Laden hiding in an area close to Abbottabad, Pakistan, four years before he (Bin Laden) was killed there. Saleh had shared the information with Pakistani President Pervez Musharraf who had angrily brushed off the claim taking no action.

In 2007, the Afghans specifically identified two Al-Qaeda safe houses in Manshera, a town just miles from Abbottabad, leading them to believe that Bin Laden was possibly hiding there. But Amrullah Saleh says that Pakistani President Pervez Musharraf angrily smashed his fist on a table when Saleh presented the information to him during a meeting in which Afghan President Hamid Karzai also took part. According to Saleh, "He said, 'Am I the president of the Republic of Banana?' Then he turned to President Karzai and said, 'Why have you brought this Panjshiri guy to teach me intelligence?'"

A December 2011 analysis report by the Jamestown Foundation comes to the conclusion that "in spite of denials by the Pakistani military, evidence is emerging that elements within the Pakistani military harbored Osama bin Laden with the knowledge of former army chief General Pervez Musharraf and possibly current Chief of Army Staff (COAS) General Ashfaq Pervez Kayani. Former Pakistani Army Chief General Ziauddin Butt (a.k.a. General Ziauddin Khawaja) revealed at a conference on Pakistani–U.S. relations in October 2011 that according to his knowledge the then former Director-General of Intelligence Bureau of Pakistan (2004–2008), Brigadier Ijaz Shah (retd.), had kept Osama bin Laden in an Intelligence Bureau safe house in Abbottabad." Pakistani General Ziauddin Butt said Bin Laden had been hidden in Abbottabad "with the full knowledge" of Pervez Musharraf. But later Butt denied making any such statement.

Assassination of pivotal Afghan leaders

The ISI has been involved in the assassination of major Afghan leaders which have been described as pivotal for the future of Afghanistan. Among those leaders are the main anti-Taliban resistance leader and National Hero of Afghanistan Ahmad Shah Massoud and the prominent Pashtun anti-Soviet and anti-Taliban resistance leader Abdul Haq. The ISI has also been accused of having been involved in the murder of former Afghan president and chief of the Karzai's administration High Peace Council Burhanuddin Rabbani and several other anti-Taliban leaders.

Massoud was killed by two Arab suicide bombers two days before the September 11, 2001 (9/11)  attacks in the United States. The assassins - supposed journalists - were granted  multiple entry visas valid for a year in early 2001 by Pakistan's embassy in London. As author and Afghanistan expert Sandy Gall writes such multiple visas for a year are "unheard of for journalists normally". The ISI subsequently facilitated the two men's passage through Pakistan over the Afghan border into Taliban territory. Afghan journalist Fahim Dashty says, "Al-Qaida, the Taliban, other terrorists, the Pakistan security services -- they were all working together ... to kill him."

Abdul Haq, who was killed by the Taliban on October 26, 2001, enjoying strong popular support among Afghanistan's Pashtuns, wanted to create and support a popular uprising against the Taliban - also dominantly Pashtuns - among the Pashtuns. Observers believe that the Taliban were only able to capture him with the collaboration of the ISI. The ISI may have previously been involved in the January 1999 murder of Haq's family members in Peshawar.

Ahmad Shah Massoud had been the only resistance leader able to defend vast parts of his territory against the Taliban, Al-Qaeda and the Pakistani military and was sheltering hundreds of thousands of refugees which had fled the Taliban on the territory under his control. He had been seen as the leader most likely to lead post-Taliban Afghanistan. After his assassination, Abdul Haq was seen as one of the main contenders for that position. He had private American backers which had facilitated his re-entry into Afghanistan after 9/11. But journalists reported about tensions between the CIA and Haq. Former CIA director George Tenet reports that, at the recommendation of one of Haq's private American lobbyists Bud McFarlane, CIA officials met with Abdul Haq in Pakistan but after assessing him urged him not to enter Afghanistan.

Both leaders, Massoud and Haq, were recognized for being fiercely independent from foreign, especially Pakistani, influence. Both, two of the most successful anti-Soviet resistance leaders, were rejecting the Pakistani claim of hegemony over the Afghan mujahideen. Abdul Haq was quoted as saying during the anti-Soviet period: "How is that we Afghans, who never lost a war, must take military instructions from the Pakistanis, who never won one?" Massoud during the Soviet period said to the Pakistani Foreign Minister who had asked him to send a message to the Russians through the Pakistanis who were conducting talks "on behalf of our Afghan brethren": "Why should I send a message? Why are you talking on our behalf? Don't we have leaders here to talk on our behalf?" Khan replied "This is how it has been and how it will be. Do you have a message?" Massoud told the foreign minister that "nobody who talks on our behalf will have any kind of result." Consequently, neither Massoud nor Abdul Haq were consulted before and neither participated in the Battle of Jalalabad (1989) in which the ISI tried but failed to install Gulbuddin Hekmatyar as the post-communist leader of Afghanistan.

See also
 CIA activities in Afghanistan
 Inter-Services Intelligence activities in India
 Operation Cyclone
 Pakistan and state-sponsored terrorism

References

Afghanistan
Afghanistan–Pakistan relations
Intelligence operations